In sub-Riemannian geometry, the Chow–Rashevskii theorem (also known as Chow's theorem)  asserts that any two points of a connected sub-Riemannian manifold, endowed with a bracket generating distribution, are connected by a horizontal path in the manifold.  It is named after Wei-Liang Chow who proved it in 1939, and Petr Konstanovich Rashevskii, who proved it independently in 1938.

The theorem has a number of equivalent statements, one of which is that the topology induced by the Carnot–Carathéodory metric is equivalent to the intrinsic (locally Euclidean) topology of the manifold. A stronger statement that implies the theorem is the ball–box theorem.

See also
 Orbit (control theory)

References

Metric geometry
Theorems in geometry